In knot theory, the Milnor conjecture says that the slice genus of the  torus knot is 

It is in a similar vein to the Thom conjecture.

It was first proved by gauge theoretic methods by Peter Kronheimer and Tomasz Mrowka. Jacob Rasmussen later gave a purely combinatorial proof using Khovanov homology, by means of the s-invariant.

References

Geometric topology
Knot theory
4-manifolds
Conjectures that have been proved